Stevenson is a crater on Mercury. Its name was adopted by the International Astronomical Union in 2012, after the Scottish author Robert Louis Stevenson.

The crater is very old and is crisscrossed by chains of secondary impact craters.

The crater Tyagaraja is to the west of Stevenson.

References

Impact craters on Mercury